Hilton Kramer (March 25, 1928 – March 27, 2012) was an American art critic and essayist.

Biography

Early life
Kramer was born in Gloucester, Massachusetts, and was educated at Syracuse University, receiving a bachelor's degree in English; Columbia University; he studied literature and philosophy at Harvard University, Indiana University, and the New School for Social Research.

Career
Kramer worked as the editor of  Arts Magazine, art critic for The Nation, and from 1965 to 1982, as chief art critic for The New York Times. He also published in the Art and Antiques Magazine and The New York Observer. Kramer's New York Post column, initially called "Times Watch" - focused on his former employer, the New York Times - and later expanded to "Media Watch", was published weekly from 1993 to November 1997.

Kramer fought against what he considered to be leftist political bias in art criticism, and what he perceived as the aesthetic nihilism characteristic of many 20th century working artists and art critics. The frustration with The New York Times'''s policies led to his resignation from the newspaper in 1982. He co-founded (with Samuel Lipman) the conservative magazine The New Criterion, for which Kramer was also co-editor and publisher. He took a strongly anti-Communist stance in his 2003 review of Anne Applebaum's Gulag: A History. In The Twilight of the Intellectuals (1999), he defended the anti-Communist views of art critic Clement Greenberg.

In 1952, Kramer took issue with the prevailing understanding of action painting as a "psychological event." He argued that such an understanding "denied the aesthetic efficacy of painting itself and attempted to remove art from the only sphere in which it can be truly experienced, which is the aesthetic sphere." He took issue with pop art, conceptual art, and postmodern art. Kramer characterized postmodernism in the visual arts as "modernism with a sneer, a giggle, modernism without any animating faith in the nobility and pertinence of its cultural mandate." He was incisive in his distinction between modernism and postmodernism, referring to the age of postmodernism as "this age of irony and institutionalized subversion." He has contrasted this with ideals he found in modernism: "the discipline of truthfulness, the rigor of honesty."

Kramer contended that federal funding of the arts favored political correctness over artistic merit.  He wrote in 1993:
The most significant thing about this bureaucratic leviathan is that it is completely captive to the political Left. Its principal purpose today is to advance the radical Left's agenda for the cultural revolution that has already completed its "long march" through the universities and is currently in the process of annexing many other institutions of cultural life—the art museums, for example, where the revolution has made enormous inroads in programs and acquisitions, and in the policies of the foundations, corporations, and agencies of government that support museums.

Kramer faulted the Whitney Biennial for what he saw as a preoccupation with gender and ethnic identity. He wrote that the biennials "seem to be governed by a positive hostility toward — a really visceral distaste for — anything that might conceivably engage the eye in a significant or pleasurable visual experience."

Death
Hilton Kramer died of heart failure on March 27, 2012, in Harpswell, Maine, two days after his 84th birthday. His only immediate survivor was his wife, Esta Kramer (1929–2020).

Works
 1973. The Age of the Avant-Garde..
 1985. The Revenge of the Philistines..
 1997 (coedited with Roger Kimball). The Future of the European Past. Chicago: Ivan R. Dee.
 1999. The Twilight of the Intellectuals: Culture and Politics in the Era of the Cold War. Chicago: Ivan R. Dee. 
 2002 (coedited with Roger Kimball). The Survival of Culture: Permanent Values in a Virtual Age. Chicago: Ivan R. Dee.
 2003, "Remembering the Gulag" (review of Anne Applebaum, 2003. Gulag: A History, Doubleday), The New Criterion 21 (9):
 2006 The Triumph of Modernism: The Art World, 1985-2005

References

External links
 New Criterion biography
 On The Paintings of Bert Carpenter
 Hilton Kramer, A Man of Arts & Letters, The New York Sun, June 9, 2006.
 Hilton Kramer dies at 84; polarizing but widely read art critic, Los Angeles Times, March 28, 2012.
 Obituary: Hilton Kramer, art critic and neoconservative World Socialist Web Site May 3, 2012
 The critic who makes them cower, The Hour, June 28, 1995.
 Hilton Kramer and the 'Correction of Taste', Wall Street Journal'', March 27, 2012.
 OPEN EVENT: Hilton Kramer Memorial
 the legacy of Hilton Kramer
 Kramer of federal funding of the arts
 Jed Perl at The New Republic April 11 2012 How Hilton Kramer Got Lost in the Culture Wars
 Terry Teachout at the Wall Street Journal April 12 2012 When Criticism is No Laughing Matter
 Hilton Kramer & the critical temper; Roger Kimball; The New Criterion, May 2012
 

1928 births
2012 deaths
American art critics
Columbia College (New York) alumni
Critics employed by The New York Times
Critics of postmodernism
Harvard University alumni
Indiana University alumni
National Humanities Medal recipients
The New York Observer people
People from Damariscotta, Maine
People from Gloucester, Massachusetts
Syracuse University College of Arts and Sciences alumni
The Nation (U.S. magazine) people